The 33rd Annual Tony Awards was broadcast by CBS television on June 3, 1979, from the Shubert Theatre in New York City. The hosts were Jane Alexander, Henry Fonda and Liv Ullmann.

The ceremony
The presenters were Tom Bosley, Barry Bostwick, Ellen Burstyn, Georgia Engel, Jane Fonda, Celeste Holm, John Houseman, Barnard Hughes, Angela Lansbury, Ron Leibman, Jack Lemmon, Hal Linden, Jean Marsh, Al Pacino and Dick Van Dyke.

The theme of the ceremony was theatrical superstitions, and various other showbusiness beliefs.

Henry Fonda received a Special Award, which was presented by his daughter Jane Fonda. Walter Cronkite presented Richard Rodgers with his Special Award.

Musicals represented: 
 Ballroom ("Fifty Percent" - Dorothy Loudon)
 The Best Little Whorehouse in Texas ("The Aggie Song" - Company)
 Eubie ("Hot Feet" - Gregory Hines)
 I Remember Mama ("A Little Bit More" - Liv Ullmann, George Hearn and Company)
  Sweeney Todd: The Demon Barber of Fleet Street ("The Worst Pies in London" - Angela Lansbury)
 They're Playing Our Song ("They're Playing Our Song" - Robert Klein and Lucie Arnaz)

Winners and nominees
Winners are in bold

Special awards
Lawrence Langner Memorial Award for Distinguished Lifetime Achievement in the American Theatre - Richard Rodgers
Regional Theatre Award - American Conservatory Theater, San Francisco, California
Henry Fonda
Walter F. Diehl, International President of Theatrical Stage Employees and Moving Picture Operators, has been an active force in advancing the well-being of the Broadway theatre and of theatre nationally.
Eugene O'Neill Memorial Theatre Center, Waterford, Connecticut

Multiple nominations and awards

These productions had multiple nominations:

9 nominations: Sweeney Todd  
8 nominations: Ballroom
7 nominations: The Best Little Whorehouse in Texas and The Elephant Man 
5 nominations: Bedroom Farce  
4 nominations: The Crucifer of Blood and They're Playing Our Song
3 nominations: Eubie!, The Grand Tour, Whose Life Is It Anyway? and Wings 
2 nominations: Platinum  

The following productions received multiple awards.

8 wins: Sweeney Todd  
3 wins: The Elephant Man 
2 wins: Bedroom Farce and The Best Little Whorehouse in Texas

See also
 Drama Desk Awards
 1979 Laurence Olivier Awards – equivalent awards for West End theatre productions
 Obie Award
 New York Drama Critics' Circle
 Theatre World Award
 Lucille Lortel Awards

References

External links
Tony Awards Official Site

Tony Awards ceremonies
1979 theatre awards
Tony
1979 in New York City
1970s in Manhattan